Athol Park is a north-western suburb of Adelaide, South Australia. It is located in the City of Charles Sturt.

Geography
The suburb lies at the western end of Grand Junction Road, which also forms its northern boundary. It is bordered to the east by Hanson Road, to the west by Glenroy Street, to the east by Hanson Rd, with Hamilton Road forming the bulk of its southern boundary.

The southern portion of Athol Park is residential with a light industrial area in the north.

The suburb is home to a large number of Housing Trust homes. In the 1990s, plans were made for the Westwood Urban Renewal project, of which Ferryden Park, Angle Park, Woodville Gardens, and Mansfield Park were also a part. This involved replacing the Housing Trust homes with either private housing or a new townhouse-style housing trust homes.

Demographics

The 2006 Census by the Australian Bureau of Statistics counted 1,307 persons in Athol Park on census night. Of these, 50.3% were male and 49.7% were female.

The majority of residents (47.9%) are of Australian birth, with other common census responses being Vietnam (15.1%) and Poland (3.4%).

The age distribution of Athol Park residents is similar to that of the greater Australian population. 63.8% of residents were over 25 years in 2006, compared to the Australian average of 66.5%; and 36.2% were younger than 25 years, compared to the Australian average of 33.5%.

Politics

Local government
Athol Park is part of Woodville Ward in the City of Charles Sturt local government area, being represented in that council by Oanh Nguyen and Robert Grant.

State and federal
Athol Park lies in the state electoral district of Cheltenham and the federal electoral division of Port Adelaide. The suburb is represented in the South Australian House of Assembly by Jay Weatherill and federally by Mark Butler.

Facilities and attractions

Shopping and dining
There are shops on Hanson Road.

Parks
Fawks Reserve is located on Hanson Road. There is also greenspace between Ely and Gateshead streets.

Transportation

Roads
Athol Park is serviced by Hanson Road, and Grand Junction Road, which forms its eastern boundary.

Public transport
Athol Park is serviced by public transport run by the Adelaide Metro.

Trains
The Finsbury railway line used to run parallel to Glenroy Street, mainly to facilitate the industrial activity in the area, but this was removed in 1979 due to industrial decline.

Buses
The suburb is serviced by the following bus routes:
252
253, 254, N254
361

See also

 List of Adelaide suburbs

References

External links

Suburbs of Adelaide
Populated places established in 1982
1982 establishments in Australia